Gideon van Zyl (born 24 November 1989 in Johannesburg) is a South African judoka. He competed in the men's 73 kg event at the 2012 Summer Olympics and was eliminated by Rustam Orujov in the second round.

References

1989 births
Living people
South African male judoka
Olympic judoka of South Africa
Judoka at the 2012 Summer Olympics
South African people of Dutch descent
Afrikaner people
Sportspeople from Johannesburg
Commonwealth Games medallists in judo
Commonwealth Games bronze medallists for South Africa
Judoka at the 2014 Commonwealth Games
African Games medalists in judo
Competitors at the 2011 All-Africa Games
African Games silver medalists for South Africa
Medallists at the 2014 Commonwealth Games